Ahmed Youssef (born January 1, 1999) is an Egyptian professional footballer who plays as a midfielder for Enppi. He joined Enppi in 2016 from Ghazl El Mahalla.

References

External links

1999 births
Living people
Ghazl El Mahalla SC players
ENPPI SC players
FC Masr players
Egyptian Premier League players
Egyptian footballers
Association football midfielders